Majid al-Shibl (1935 – May 11, 2016), original name Muhammad al-Shibil, was a prominent Saudi announcer who introduced several programs and variety.

Illness
In 1999 suffered a stroke entered the hospital and released, King Fahd bin Abdulaziz decision treatment are at the King Faisal Specialist Hospital recovered from Geltth and returned media work for a brief period, but the symptoms of the disease and old age weary too much, leaving the media work during the year 2000.

Death
He died on Wednesday, May 11, 2016 after a long illness at the age of 81 years.

References

External links 
 Majid al-Shibl: the voice of the real Broadcaster!
 Biography Majid al-Shibil
 Majid al-Shibil «Riyadh»: my preoccupation media estranged for the collection of my poems

1935 births
2016 deaths
People from Al-Qassim Province
Saudi Arabian media personalities